The Cathedral of Cartagena in Spain, or the Cathedral of Santa María la Vieja, was a cathedral of the Diocese of Cartagena, located on the hill of La Concepción in the old town of Cartagena.  It has been in ruins since 1939, when it was destroyed when Cartagena was shelled in the Spanish Civil War by Nationalist forces.

History 
Cartagena had a see before the Muslim conquest of Spain, but no trace of the pre-conquest cathedral has been found yet.  In 1243 Alfonso X of Castile launched a campaign to reconquer the Kingdom of Murcia, and petitioned Pope Innocent IV to restore the Diocese of Cartagena.  In 1250 the Pope issued the bull "Spiritus exultante" restoring the diocese. The first bishop of the new phase of the Diocese was the Franciscan friar Pedro Gallego, Alfonso's confessor.

There is inconclusive evidence whether there was a cathedral in Cartagena at that time. In medieval and Renaissance documents the church is described as "Iglesia Mayor", and is only called "Old Cathedral" from the eighteenth century.

García Martínez, the second bishop of the diocese, decided with the consent of King Sancho IV to transfer the see to Murcia, although retaining the name of Diocese of Cartagena.  The church therefore lost its status of a cathedral, and became a parish church.

Throughout the centuries, there were continuing demands to the Vatican for the restitution of the bishopric to Cartagena. The church of Santa María de Gracia, with the shape and dimensions of a cathedral, was built in the 18th century on a different site, with the aim of becoming the seat of the diocese in place of the original church.

In the late nineteenth century the foundations of the medieval church collapsed. The church was restored by the architect Victor Beltrí, in Romanesque style with modernist elements.

During the Spanish Civil War the church was attacked and the contents damaged on 25 July 1936. In 1939 it was bombed and has remained abandoned since then.

Roman theatre 

In 1988 a Roman theatre was discovered during building works near the old cathedral.  It was found that the old cathedral had been built over the upper part of the theatre, using some material from the theatre.

References 

Cathedral
Churches in the Region of Murcia
Former cathedrals
Former churches in Spain
Roman Catholic cathedrals in the Region of Murcia